Scarborough Castle is a crag rising to about 30 m near the northeast Entrance point to Shirreff Cove, Livingston Island, in the South Shetland Islands. Roughly charted and named by British sealer Robert Fildes in 1821.

Rock formations of Livingston Island